Janusz Kowalski (born 8 June 1952) is a Polish former racing cyclist. He won the Tour de Pologne 1976.

Palmarès

References

External links 

1952 births
Living people
Polish male cyclists
People from Świebodzin
Sportspeople from Lubusz Voivodeship